Altyn Tamyr is a Kazakh magazine. Along with DAT and Tortinshi Bilik, it is an opposition news source. Ularbek Baitailaq, an archivist of the  Kazakh National Archive, has contributed articles to the resource.

References

See also
Media of Kazakhstan

Newspapers published in Kazakhstan
Kazakh-language mass media